The ATmega88 is an electronic integrated circuit microcontroller produced by the Atmel corporation. It has the basic Atmel AVR instruction set. One of the packaging configurations is the dual in-line package (DIP). It has an 8-bit core and 8K flash (program) memory. 

Many of Atmel's microcontrollers in this line have similar instruction sets, so if an engineer learns the instruction set from one of their microprocessors, this knowledge is transferable to other microcontrollers in the line.

Features

References

External links 
atmel.com: ATmega48/88/168 Summary (494 kB pdf)

See also 
 ATmega328
 AVR microcontrollers
 Atmel AVR instruction set
 ATtiny microcontroller comparison chart
 In-system programming

Atmel microcontrollers